The Dusunic languages are a group of languages spoken by the Bisaya and Dusun (including Kadazan and Rungus), and related peoples in the Malaysian province of Sabah on Borneo.

Languages
The Dusunic languages are classified as follows.

Bisaya–Lotud: Brunei Bisaya, Sabah Bisaya, Lotud
Dusun: Central Dusun–Coastal Kadazan, Kuijau, Papar, Labuk-Kinabatangan Kadazan, Kota Marudu Talantang, Kimaragang–Tebilung–Rungus, Klias River Kadazan, 
Dumpas may also belong here. 

Not all languages spoken by the Dusun people belong to this group; the East Barito languages include several which are also named 'Dusun'.

Lobel (2016)
Lobel (2016) covers the following Dusunic languages:
Rungus
Kadazan Papar
Kadazan Kimanis
Kadazan Membakut
Dusun Tambunan
Kujau
Minokok
Sungai Kinabatangan
Dusun Talantang
Dusun Tobilung
Dusun Liwan
Dusun Bundu
Dumpas

References 

King, Julie K., and John Wayne King. 1984. Languages of Sabah: A survey report. C-78. Canberra: Pacific Linguistics, The Australian National University.
Lobel, Jason William. 2016. North Borneo Sourcebook: Vocabularies and Functors. University of Hawaii Press.